The Alliance of Women Film Journalists Award for Best Picture is an annual award given by the Alliance of Women Film Journalists. The award is often referred to as an EDA as a tribute to AWFJ founder Jennifer Merin's mother, actress Eda Reiss Merin. EDA is also an acronym for Excellent Dynamic Activism.

Winners

2000s

2010s

References

 Alliance of Women Film Journalists official website

Alliance of Women Film Journalists
American film awards
Awards for best film